Alain Tourret (born 25 December 1947) is a French politician. He served as the deputy for Calvados's 6th constituency.  He was deputy from 1997 to 2002, then again from 2012 to 2022.  He was previously a member of Radical Party of the Left then La République En Marche! from 2017.

Honours
  Order of the Rising Sun, 2nd Class, Gold and Silver Star (2022)

See also
 French legislative elections 2017

References

1947 births
Living people
Deputies of the 12th National Assembly of the French Fifth Republic
Deputies of the 14th National Assembly of the French Fifth Republic
Deputies of the 15th National Assembly of the French Fifth Republic
20th-century French lawyers
Radical Party of the Left politicians
La République En Marche! politicians
People from Boppard
University of Caen Normandy alumni
Mayors of places in Normandy
Recipients of the Order of the Rising Sun, 2nd class